Atherstone Town Community Football Club is a football club based in Atherstone, Warwickshire, England.

History
The original club was formed in 1887. They reached the semi-finals of the FA Amateur Cup in 1907–08, losing 3–0 to Stockton. The following season saw them reach the semi-final stage again, this time losing 3–0 to Clapton. After playing in several local leagues, they joined the Birmingham Combination in 1911, and were runners-up in their first season in the league. The club finished bottom of the league in 1923–24 and again in 1928–29. Following World War II, they were league champions in 1947–48, also winning the Birmingham Senior Cup. When the Combination folded in 1954, all but one of the clubs joined the Birmingham & District League, with Atherstone placed in the transitional Northern Division. A fourteenth-place finish in 1954–55 saw them placed in Division Two for the following season. They went on to finish as runners-up in Division Two, and were promoted to Division One.

Atherstone finished bottom of Division One in 1957–58 and were relegated back to Division Two. However, they finished third in Division Two the following season and were promoted to Division One. The league was reduced to a single division in 1960, and was renamed the West Midlands (Regional) League in 1962. When it expanded in 1965, Atherstone became members of the Premier Division. They were runners-up in the division in 1971–72 and were promoted to Division One North of the Southern League. After finishing as runners-up in Division One North the following season, the club were promoted to the Premier Division, where they remained until folding at the end of the 1978–79 season.

The club was immediately reformed as Atherstone United, taking the reserve team's place in Division One of the West Midlands (Regional) League. They were Division One champions in 1981–82, earning promotion to the Premier Division. After winning the Premier Division title in 1986–87, the club were promoted to the Midland Division of the Southern League. The following season saw them reach the first round of the FA Cup for the first time, eventually losing 2–0 to VS Rugby in a first round replay. They were Midland Division runners-up in 1988–89, securing promotion to the Premier Division. In 1990–91 the club reached the FA Cup first round again; after beating Fleetwood Town 3–1 in the first round, they lost 1–0 at Third Division Crewe Alexandra in the second round. Another FA Cup first round appearance the following season saw them hold Fourth Division Hereford United to a 0–0 draw at Sheepy Road, before losing the replay at Edgar Street 3–0.

Atherstone finished bottom of the Southern League Premier Division in 1999–2000 season and were relegated to the Western Division. They subsequently folded midway through the 2003–04 season. The club was then reformed under the name Atherstone Town, joining Division One of the Midland Combination for the 2004–05 season. After winning Division One and the President's Cup in their first season, they were Premier Division champions and League Cup winners in 2005–06 and were promoted to the Midland Alliance. The club were Midland Alliance champions in 2007–08, earning promotion to Division One Midlands of the Southern League. In 2008–09 they finished third in the division, qualifying for the promotion play-offs, but lost the semi-final 5–0 to Chasetown

Division One Midlands was renamed Division One Central in 2010, and Atherstone were relegated back to the Midland Alliance at the end of the 2010–11 season after finishing second-from-bottom of the division. They suffered a second successive relegation after finishing second-from-bottom of the Midland Alliance the following season, returning to the Premier Division of the Midland Combination. When the Combination merged with the Midland Alliance to form the Midland League in 2014, Atherstone were placed in Division One.

Season-by-season record

Honours
Midland Alliance
Champions 2007–08
West Midlands (Regional) League
Premier Division champions 1986–87
Division One champions 1981–82
Midland Combination
Premier Division champions 2005–06
Division One champions 2004–05
League Cup winners 2005–06
President's Cup winners 2004–05
Birmingham Combination
Champions 1947–48
Birmingham Senior Cup
Winners 1947–48, 1974–75
Walsall Senior Cup
Winners 1969–70, 1983–84

Records
Best FA Cup performance: Second round, 1990–91
Best FA Amateur Cup performance: Semi-finals, 1907–08, 1908–09
Best FA Trophy performance: Third round, 1975–76, 1977–78
Best FA Vase performance: Quarter-finals, 1982–83, 2019–20, 2022–23

See also
Atherstone Town F.C. players
Atherstone Town F.C. managers

References

External links

 
Football clubs in England
Football clubs in Warwickshire
Association football clubs established in 1887
1887 establishments in England
Association football clubs established in 1979
1979 establishments in England
Association football clubs established in 2004
2004 establishments in England
Atherstone
Birmingham Combination
West Midlands (Regional) League
Southern Football League clubs
Midland Football Combination
Midland Football Alliance
Midland Football League